The cycling competition at the 1968 Summer Olympics consisted of two road cycling events and five track cycling events, all for men only.

Medal summary

Road cycling

Track cycling

Participating nations
329 cyclists from 52 nations competed.

Medal table

References

 
1968 Summer Olympics events
1968
1968 in track cycling
1968 in road cycling
1968 in cycle racing